Roland Griffiths-Marsh,  (22 April 1923 – 29 December 2012) was an Australian soldier and author.

Early life
Griffiths-Marsh was born in Penang, then part of the British Straits Settlements, on 22 April 1923 and grew up in Hai Phong, Indochina. On 29 February 1940, at the age of sixteen, he enlisted with the Second Australian Imperial Force, taking his older brother's name and date of birth to ensure entry.

Second World War

Griffiths-Marsh served in the 2/8th Battalion in North Africa and New Guinea, before being recruited to Z Special Unit, a specialist reconnaissance and sabotage unit that operated behind Japanese lines in South-East Asia. He served in the Semut I operation in North Borneo, and was parachuted behind enemy lines to conduct guerrilla warfare with the assistance of local fighters in early June 1945. He was awarded the Military Medal for his service with Z Special Unit, the award was gazetted on 6 March 1947, dated 2 November 1945. The original recommendation for the award states:

Later life
Griffiths-Marsh wrote about his wartime experiences in his 1990 book Sixpenny Soldier. That same year the book was awarded both The Nettie Palmer Prize for Non-fiction (one of the Victorian Premier's Literary Awards), and the Colin Roderick Award, awarded annually for "the best book published in Australia which deals with any aspect of Australian life" along with the H.T. Priestley Memorial Medal.  This book was republished under the title I was Only Sixteen in 1995.

Papers by Griffiths-Marsh about the training of his native guerrilla force and service in North Borneo are held at the Australian War Memorial.

Griffith-Marsh died on 29 December 2012 aged 89.

Book details
Sixpenny Soldier 1990 Australia: Collins-Angus & Robertson.  Republished as
I Was Only Sixteen 1995 Australia, Potts Point, N.S.W.: ETT Imprint.   (pbk.)

See also
 Jack Wong Sue

References

External links
 Australian Government WW2 Nominal Roll for Griffiths-Marsh
 Profile of Griffiths-Marsh

1923 births
2012 deaths
Australian Army soldiers
Australian memoirists
Australian recipients of the Military Medal
Z Special Unit personnel
Malaysian emigrants to Australia
Malaysian expatriates in Vietnam